Uldalsåna is a lake on the border of the municipalities of Birkenes and Froland in Agder county, Norway.  It is part of the Tovdalselva river drainage basin. On the southeastern end of the lake, there is a hydroelectric dam which releases water into the waterfall, Hanefoss, on its way down to the lake Herefossfjorden near the village of Herefoss.  The lake is fed by the rivers Rettåna and Skjeggedalsåna.  The lake Nystølfjorden flows into the river Skjeggedalsåna.

See also
List of lakes in Aust-Agder
List of lakes in Norway

References

Lakes of Agder
Birkenes
Froland
Reservoirs in Norway